The 2005 NCAA Division III men's basketball tournament was the 31st annual single-elimination tournament to determine the national champions of National Collegiate Athletic Association (NCAA) men's Division III collegiate basketball in the United States.

The field contained sixty-four teams, and each program was allocated to one of four sectionals. All sectional games were played on campus sites, while the national semifinals, third-place final, and championship finals were contested at the Salem Civic Center in Salem, Virginia.

Defending champions Wisconsin–Stevens Point defeated Rochester (NY), 73–49, in the championship, clinching their first national title. Stevens Point were the first men's Division III program to defend their national title since Wisconsin–Platteville in 1999.

The Pointers (29–3) were again coached by Jack Bennett.

Jason Kalsow, also from Stevens Point, was named Most Outstanding Player.

Championship rounds
Site: Salem Civic Center, Salem, Virginia

See also
2005 NCAA Division I men's basketball tournament
2005 NCAA Division II men's basketball tournament
2005 NCAA Division III women's basketball tournament
2005 NAIA Division I men's basketball tournament

References

NCAA Division III men's basketball tournament
Ncaa Tournament
NCAA Men's Division III Basketball